The  was a professional wrestling tournament organised by DDT Pro-Wrestling in its sub-brand , during which eight wrestlers from different promotions competed in street fights to determine who is the "best street wrestler in the world". Chris Brookes won the tournament on April 23, 2022, by defeating Abdullah Kobayashi in the final.

Background
On March 20, 2022, at Judgement, it was announced that an eight-person street fight tournament would be held in April and broadcast on CyberFight's video on demand service Wrestle Universe. Every participant would represent their hometown and a championship title they have held. On March 25, the bracket, the dates and locations of the first round matches were revealed during a press conference.

Tournament
The tournament was held between April 10 and 23.

See also
CZW Tournament of Death

Footnotes

References

External links

Wrestle Universe

DDT Pro-Wrestling
Professional wrestling tournaments